The Lost Album is the fifth studio album by the British neo soul composer and multi-instrumentalist Lewis Taylor, which was released in 2004. This was his final album, until the release of Numb in 2022.

Taylor recorded this album in the late 1990s, in reaction to British press naming him "new British blue-eyed soulster". He intended it to be released as a follow-up to his 1996 self-titled debut, but Island Records rejected it, after which he returned with the album Lewis II. The Lost Album was finally released in 2004, through Taylor's own label, Slow Reality.

Track listing
Lost (Sabina Smyth) - 1:33
Listen Here (Smyth, Taylor) - 4:18
Hide Your Heart Away (Taylor) - 4:53
Send Me an Angel (Smyth, Taylor) - 4:48
The Leader of the Band (Taylor) - 4:29
Yeah (Smyth, Taylor) - 4:46
Please Help Me If You Can (Taylor) - 4:21
Let's Hope Nobody Finds Us (Smyth, Taylor) - 4:43
New Morning (Smyth, Taylor) - 5:45
Say I Love You (Taylor) - 4:43
See My Way (Taylor) - 4:02
One More Mystery (Taylor) - 4:49

References

2005 albums
Lewis Taylor albums